German Orientalism in the Age of Empire: Religion, Race, and Scholarship is a 2010 book on the influence of Orient studies in 19th-century Germany, written by Suzanne L. Marchand.

Bibliography

External links 

 

2009 non-fiction books
Books about Germany
Cambridge University Press books
English-language books